Salvia pinguifolia (rock sage) is a species of flowering plant in the family Lamiaceae that is native to  southern Arizona, southern New Mexico, and western Texas in the United States as well as Chihuahua in Mexico. The specific name is derived from the Latin words pinguis, meaning, "grease", and folium, meaning "leaf," referring to the texture of the leaves. Leaf shape is ovate-deltoid to oblong elliptical. S. pinguifolia had a greater range during the Late Wisconsin glacial period; for example, it was present in the Waterman Mountains of southeastern Arizona (northern Pima County) in that earlier epoch, but is no longer extant there.

References

External links

USDA Plants Profile
Benny Simpson's Texas Native Shrubs

pinguifolia
Flora of Arizona
Flora of Chihuahua (state)
Flora of New Mexico
Flora of Texas